Canelles Reservoir is a reservoir in the Pre-Pyrenees area in Spain. It is located in the Noguera Ribagorzana river bordering the province of Huesca, Aragon and the province of Lleida, Catalonia. It was built by the Spanish power utility ENHER.

See also 
 List of dams and reservoirs in Aragon
 List of dams and reservoirs in Catalonia

References

Reservoirs in Aragon
Reservoirs in Catalonia